The ICW / IWCCW Women's Championship was a women's professional wrestling championship in International World Class Championship Wrestling that existed from 1985 until the federation closed its doors in 1995. The title was first promoted as the “International Championship Wrestling Women’s Title” but was later renamed the “International World Class Championship Wrestling Women’s title” when the federation was renamed as well. The Women's title is the earliest ICW created title in existence with both the ICW Tag-team and the ICW Heavyweight title being created after ICW and WWC stopped working together. The Women's title was only defended sporadically as ICW/IWCCW infrequently featured female competitors. Because the championship is a professional wrestling championship, it is not won or lost competitively but instead by the decision of the bookers of a wrestling promotion. The championship is awarded after the chosen team "wins" a match to maintain the illusion that professional wrestling is a competitive sport.

Title history

Footnotes

References
General sources

Specific sources

International World Class Championship Wrestling championships
Women's professional wrestling championships